Theodosius Mar Thoma XXII Metropolitan (born 19 February 1949) is the Mar Thoma Metropolitan and the Primate of the Mar Thoma Syrian Church. Theodosius Mar Thoma presently occupies the Apostolic Throne of St Thomas and is also the first Mar Thoma Metropolitan to be born in post-independence India.

Ordination 

Theodosius studied at Baselius College, Kottayam (1966) and Mar Thoma College, Thiruvalla (1969). After taking a degree in Science, he joined Leonard Theological College and took BD Degree in 1972. His ordination as Kasseesa was on 24 February 1973. From 1979-1980, he studied Comparative Religions in Visva-Bharati University, Shantiniketan. He did his MA and Ph.D. from McMaster University, Hamilton, Canada from 1980-1986.

Episcopa 

He was consecrated as Episcopa, Geevarghese Mar Theodosius, on 9 December 1989, along with Geevarghese Mar Athanasius and Euyakim Mar Coorilos Episcopa.

Suffragan metropolitan 

On 12 July 2020, he was given the title Suffragan Metropolitan during the service at Poolatheen Chapel officiated by the Metropolitan The Joseph Mar Thoma in the presence of bishops, clergy, and laity of the church.

Mar Thoma Metropolitanate 

After the swearing-in of 1653, it became necessary to appoint a bishop. For this purpose, a special chair was made and Mar Thoma I the first bishop of Malankara Church was enthroned. This throne, used for the consecration of Mar Thoma I, is in the possession of the Mar Thoma Church and is kept at Tiruvalla. It has been used in the installation of every Mar Thoma metropolitan to this day so that the continuity of the throne of Mar Thoma is ensured. This was the throne used for the consecration of Mar Thoma XXII, Theodosius Mar Thoma.

It is said[who?] that after Thomas Mar Athanasius lost the case against the Orthodox Faction he had come back to the old seminary in Kottayam to vacate his room; some members of the church out of resentment had emptied everything inside and kept it outside the premises along with the Malankara Throne. By seeing the insignificance of a chair, they put out the chair to say isn't this the claim of your independent roots, take this degradable "Throne of Mar Thoma", Thomas Mar Athanasius had to then take that chair also which had by then broken a leg back to Maramon. The faction led by Thomas Mar Athanasius Metropolitan started to  use the title of Mar Thoma Metropolitan.

Enthronement 
On 14 November 2020, Thirumeni was installed as the 22nd Mar Thoma Metropolitan with the title Theodosius Mar Thoma Metropolitan. The installation service was held at Dr. Alexander Mar Thoma Valiya Metropolitan Smaraka Auditorium, Thiruvalla.

Ordination dates 

 Ordained as Deacon - 24 June 1972
 Ordained as Kassissa - 24 February 1973
 Ordained as Ramban - 11 April 1989
 Consecrated as Episcopa - 12 September 1989
 Installed as Suffragan Metropolitan - 12 July 2020
 Installed as Mar Thoma Metropolitan - 14 November 2020

See also

 Throne of St. Thomas
 Syrian Malabar Nasrani
 Saint Thomas Christians
 Christianity in India
 List of Syrian Malabar Nasranis

References

External links

 marthoma.in

1949 births
Mar Thoma Syrian Church
People from Pathanamthitta district
Saint Thomas Christians
Malayali people
Metropolitans of the Mar Thoma Syrian Church
Christian clergy from Kerala
Living people
Mahatma Gandhi University, Kerala alumni
Senate of Serampore College (University) alumni
McMaster University alumni
Leonard Theological College alumni